Parectopa promylaea is a moth of the family Gracillariidae. It is known from Assam, India.

References

Gracillariinae
Moths of Asia